Tandridge is a local government district in east Surrey, England. Its council is based in Oxted, although the largest settlement is Caterham; other notable settlements include Warlingham, Godstone and Lingfield. In mid-2019, the district had an estimated population of 88,129.

Tandridge borders the Borough of Reigate and Banstead to the west, the London Borough of Croydon to the north, the London Borough of Bromley to the north-east, the Sevenoaks District of Kent to the east, the Wealden District of East Sussex to the south-east, the Mid Sussex District of West Sussex to the south and the Borough of Crawley, also in West Sussex, to the south-west.

The district contains parts of the North Downs Area of Outstanding Natural Beauty and the Weald. It also contains several woodlands and some open heathland.

History
It is named after a hillside village and slope on the south slope of the North Downs, Tandridge. Tandridge hundred, an early local government district, covered roughly the same area. By the late 19th century, hundreds were no longer relevant, and urban and rural districts replaced any remaining functions in 1894.

The vast majority of the district is covered by the Metropolitan Green Belt to prevent extension of the London urban area.

The district was formed on 1 April 1974, under the Local Government Act 1972, by the merger of Caterham and Warlingham urban district and Godstone Rural District. Since 2000, civil parish councils once again cover the district.

The district is not currently twinned, but one of its towns, Lingfield, is twinned with Plaisance-du-Touch, a commune on the outskirts of Toulouse, France.

Governance

Elections to Tandridge District Council are held in three out of every four years, with one third of the 42 seats on the council being elected at each election. From the first election in 1973 to 1990 the Conservative party controlled the council, but for most of the 1990s no party had a majority. This changed at the 2000 election when the Conservatives regained a majority. In 2019, Tandridge Council entered No Overall Control. As of the 2022 election the council is composed of the following councillors:-

District Council Committees
Community Services - leisure, refuse collection, recycling, public toilets, litter, street cleaning
Planning - planning, applications, development
Housing - council housing
Licensing
Overview & Scrutiny - corporate strategy, performance indicators, Best Value, audit reports
Planning Policy - Local Plan, Land charges, building control, environmental health
Resources - Finance, community safety, Council Tax, benefits, business rates, information technology
Standards - councillors' code of conduct

Towns, villages, neighbourhoods and Civil Parish(es)

Each civil parish is named after one of its towns or villages which has been established around an Anglican church.  All other settlements/neighbourhoods with their own Anglican church or chapel and therefore traditionally in England defined as "a village" are marked with an asterisk.
A double asterisk indicates the locality has a church hall used as a Church of England church.  One chapel in Limpsfield ecclesiastical parish and civil parish has no adjoining settlement, in Staffhurst Wood.

Arms

See also
List of places of worship in Tandridge (district)

References

External links
 District Council website

 
Non-metropolitan districts of Surrey
Coast to Capital Local Enterprise Partnership